Norazo (hangul: 노라조) is a musical male duo from South Korea, known for their eccentric stages and comical lyrics. The two original members were Jo Bin and Lee Hyuk. They were also participants in the musical variety show, Immortal Songs. The duo debuted in 2005. After Lee Hyuk's departure from the group vocalist Won Heum joined as the new member.

History
Jo Bin and Lee Hyuk met accidentally as they started to use the same practice room. Jo cited Lee's good physique and singing skills that first caught his attention. Jo decided to trick Lee into joining him by telling him they were to sing ballads. Later they decided to do music different from the usual K-pop sound.

Lee Hyuk left the duo in February 2017. Vocalist Won Heum joined as the new member and they released their first song together on the 21st of August, 2018.

Members
Current
 Jo Bin - vocals
 Jo Won Heum - vocals
Former
 Lee Hyuk- vocals, guitar

Discography

Albums
 2005.08.02 Norazo - The First Album
 2007.03.20 Miseongnyeon jabulgama (미성년자불가마)
 2008.11.20 Three Go
 2010.04.20 Hwangoltaltae (환골탈태)
 2011.11.04 Jeongukjepae (전국제패)

Extended Play

Singles

Collaboration

OST
 2014.05.12 Ineffective Boss Without Power (치이고 박히고 무능상사)
 2019.02.22  The Fiery Priest OST Part 1 "Hero" (우리동네 HERO )
 2019.10.26 Pegasus Market OST Part 3 "Pegasus Market" (쌉니다 천리마마트)
 2020.12.13  Mr. Queen OST Part 1 "Bong Hwan-ah" (봉환아)

References

External links
 Official Website 
 

South Korean pop music groups
South Korean rock music groups
South Korean musical duos
Musical groups established in 2005